1900 was a year.

1900 may also refer to:

1900 BC, a year
1900 (film), a 1976 Italian epic film
1900 (magazine), a Dutch bi-monthly sports publication focusing on football club Ajax Amsterdam
The ICL / ICT computers, ICT 1900 series
The Beechcraft 1900, aircraft
SP1900 EMU, a train in Hong Kong
A Premium-rate telephone number (1-900)
1900, a 2008 album by Caramel Jack

See also

 
 Series 1900 (disambiguation)
 1-900 (disambiguation)
 1900s (disambiguation)
 190 (disambiguation)